Onion soup is a type of vegetable soup with sliced onions as the main ingredient. It is prepared in different variations in many different countries, the most famous of which is the French onion soup or Parisian onion soup. Because of the affordable ingredients, it has primarily been a dish for the poor for a long time.

Common for all variations of onion soup is the use of thinly sliced or chopped onions soaked in fat, and a liquid base such as water or broth, possibly including white wine, after which the soup is cooked for a while so that the onions lose their strong flavour and the soup gains a sweet, spicy flavour. In many recipes the soup is thickened with flour or egg yolks.

French onion soup

An early recipe called soupe à l'oignon could be found in the recipe collection Le Viandier by Guillaume Tirel in the 15th century. François Pierre La Varenne, the chef of Marie de' Medici, described the use of bread as an addition to onion soup in his 1651 cookbook Le Cuisinier François.

The French or Parisian onion soup (soupe à l'oignon or soupe d'oignons aux Halles) was already offered as food for merchants, customers and tourists in the Quartier des Halles in the 18th century.

The classic way to prepare the dish is to slowly soak thinly sliced onions, sometimes also garlic, in butter or vegetable oil, until they gain a golden yellow colour, then to sprinkle them with flour and soak them in white wine. Then water and vegetable broth or more commonly, meat broth is added and the soup is slowly cooked. It is also common to soak roasted bits of white bread (croutons) in the soup, add shredded cheese and gratinate the whole dish (soupe à l'oignon gratinée or soupe au fromage, see also cheese soup).

The Strasbourg onion soup is similar to the Parisian one, the difference being the use of croutons and a raw egg yolk.

A further variety is the soupe Soubise, where the onions are puréed and the soup is thickened with Béchamel sauce. Instead of roast bread the soup is served with croutons and bits of choux pastry. Similarly to Soubise sauce, the soup was named after its creator, the field marshal and gourmet Charles, Prince of Soubise.

German onion soup
Onion soup similar to the French variety is also known in Germany. The Palatinate onion soup is prepared with cream and wine, spiced with caraway, and served with roast bread without cheese. The south German onion soup is thickened with light roux, run through a sieve, thickened with egg yolk and served with bits of roast bread. Marie Buchmeier's 1885 cookbook Praktischem Kochbuch für die bürgerliche, sowie feine Küche contains an extremely simple recipe for the soup, where sliced dark bread is soaked in a terrine, soaked with boiling water and served with sliced onions turned yellow with butter. Onion soup from the Rhine area contains onions, meat broth, bits of carrot and roasted bratwurst. The soup is run through a sieve and spiced with vinegar, the bratwurst is sliced and served along the soup. Hamburgian onion soup is prepared with shallots, meat broth and sherry and served with croutons and cheese.

Italian onion soup
As well as the French onion soup, there is also a variety in Italy, where milk is substituted for the broth and the wine. It is served with croutons and shredded Parmesan cheese, which are not roasted.

The Cipollata is a dish of its own, resembling the German Eintopf soup. It is prepared with onions, sliced bacon and tomatoes, which are thoroughly boiled and added to the soup with a mix of Parmesan and whipped eggs. If the soup becomes too thick it is watered down. Cipollata is also served with roast bread.

Arabian onion soup
Cherbah, Arabian onion soup, includes bell peppers, tomatoes and garlic, which are sliced together with onions. The soup is thickened with meat broth. The soup is spiced with black pepper, salt, fresh mint and lemon juice. Cherbah is finally thickened with egg yolk.

Bibliography
Herings Lexikon der Küche. 23rd edition, Fachbuchverlag Pfannenberg, Haan-Gruiten, 2001, 
Erhard Gorys: Das neue Küchenlexikon. dtv, Munich 1994–2002, 
Madeleine Dupré: Die berühmte französische Küche. Heyne Verlag, Munich 1975, 
André Castelot: L'Histoire a Table, 1972. 
Henriette Davidis, Luise Holle: Praktisches Kochbuch für die gewöhnliche und feinere Küche. Revised edition by Luise Holle. Bielefeld / Leipzig 1898
Marie Buchmeier: Praktisches Kochbuch für die bürgerliche, sowie feine Küche, enthaltend circa 1500 Kochrecepte. Landshut o. J. (around 1885)
Accademia della Cucina Italiana (publisher): Das große Buch der italienischen Küche. Delphin Verlag, Munich 1987. 
Der Silberlöffel. Phaidon Verlag, Berlin 2006,

References

External links
 

Vegetable soups
French cuisine
German cuisine
Italian cuisine
Arab cuisine